Ronni Kahn AO is an Australian social entrepreneur, best known for founding the food rescue charity OzHarvest.

Born in South Africa, Kahn moved to Israel where she lived on a kibbutz for many years before emigrating to Australia in 1998 and starting an events management business. On a vacation to South Africa, she was galvanised into action by a friend when visiting Soweto who told her that "she was responsible for electricity in Soweto". Kahn recalls that was the moment her life of purpose began. I knew I had to come back and do something meaningful for other people..." Building on her experience in corporate hospitality, she was shocked by the amount of food waste, although not initially aware of the relationship between food waste and environmental problems.

OzHarvest 

Kahn founded OzHarvest in 2004, initially with the support of people in the restaurant and catering industries in Sydney. It is a non-denominational charity that rescues excess food which would otherwise be discarded and distributes it to charities supporting the vulnerable around Australia. After lobbying for changes to civil liability and health legislation that prevented food donors from supplying excess food, the legislation was changed in four Australian states starting in New South Wales in 2005. Kahn says OzHarvest "delivers the equivalent of 25 million meals a year that would otherwise be dumped".
Kahn was behind the creation of the NEST program – Nutrition, Education & Sustenance Training – which aims to educate vulnerable Australians about nutrition and healthy eating, providing valuable life skills to disadvantaged and marginalized communities.

In her advocacy, Kahn highlights the broader global issues affecting food waste. In 2017 OzHarvest for the fifth year partnered with the United Nations Environment Program (UNEP) on the Think.Eat.Save Campaign. In December 2014 Ronni traveled to attend the Sustainable Innovation Forum in Lima, Peru as part of the Think.Eat.Save campaign - held at the margins of the UNFCCC Climate Change Conference. The event served to remind delegates of the level that food waste contributes to dangerous greenhouse gasses which affect climate change and the amount of resources squandered when food is wasted. She has said that "If food waste was a country, it would be the third biggest emitter of carbon and methane gas after the US and China".

In 2018, Kahn was looking for a location in Sydney to establish a refettorio in collaboration with Italian chef and restaurateur Massimo Bottura, whom she had met in 2016 and who established a series not-for-profit restaurants that aim “to empower communities to fight food waste through social inclusion”. The plan is for OzHarvest to look after the site, operations, volunteers and supply of rescued food as well as communicate with agencies that supply food to people in need. In 2020, the chosen site for the OzHarvest Refettorio was announced as 481 Crown Street, Sydney.  In 2022, OzHarvest served its 50 millionth donated meal.

Food Fighter (2018) 
A biographical/documentary film about Kahn's crusade to reduce food waste was released in 2018. It was produced and directed by Daniel Goldberg over two years and covers Kahn's efforts in Australia, the United Kingdom, South Africa and Thailand.

A Repurposed Life (2020) 
Kahn's memoir A Repurposed Life was released in 2020. Kahn said: “I didn’t grow up being ambitious about anything, but when you find your calling, then you are  empowered by a force that is unstoppable.''

Awards
Ronni Kahn has been acknowledged as a leader in the fields of entrepreneurship, social impact and innovation. Her contributions  have been widely recognised through numerous awards including:

 2010 Australia's Local Hero, Australian of the Year Awards, in recognition of her work founding OzHarvest.
 2010 Enriched List, American Express 
 2011 InStyle Woman of Style Award - Community /Charity category 
 2012 Veuve Clicquot Award Business Woman Tribute Award for Innovation, Entrepreneurial Skill and Contribution to the Community 
 2012 Ernst & Young Social Entrepreneur of the Year
 2017 BOSS magazine Top 21 True Leaders 
 2017 Gourmet Traveller Outstanding Contribution to Hospitality
 2017 Griffith University Doctor of the University (honoris causa)
 2018 The Australian Financial Review 100 Women of Influence award for social enterprise and not-for-profit
 2019 Officer of the Order of Australia (AO). For distinguished service to social welfare, particularly through the development and delivery of innovative programs.

See also
List of Australian Local Hero Award recipients
Waste management in Australia

References

External links
 OzHarvest website

Living people
Year of birth missing (living people)
South African Jews
Australian Jews
Australian women activists
Australian women in business
Israeli Jews
South African emigrants to Australia
Officers of the Order of Australia